Nenking Group, or Nanhai Nenking, is a Chinese conglomerate founded on 28 March 1998 and based in Foshan, Guangdong, providing Real Estate, Property Management, Financial, Sports Culture, Pharmaceuticals, Investment Abroad, Trade Purchases services over the Pearl River Delta Metropolitan Region of China.

Nenking is the owner of a CBA team called the "Guangzhou Loong Lions", and it is also the title sponsor of Hong Kong "Eastern Sports Club", including "Eastern Football Team" and "Eastern Basketball Team". In 2018, Nenking started stepping in esports, organizing an OWL team for Guangzhou named the "Guangzhou Charge".

History 
 In 1993, Guangdong Nenking Real Estate Development Co., Ltd founded. It was the predecessor of Nenking Group.
 On 28 March 1998, Nenking Holdings Group Co., Ltd founded.
 In 2010, Nenking acquired Shaanxi men's basketball club and named it the "Long-Lions".
 On 12 August 2016, Hong Kong sports powerhouse "Eastern Sports Club" announced that Nenking got the title sponsorship of the Club", which including Football Team and Basketball Team. "Eastern" was facing a financial crisis before this and Nenking, acting as the white knight, poured around 30 million HK$ into "Eastern".
 On 7 March 2017, "Rupert Hoogewerf's Global Rich List 2017" released. Nenking's founder and chairman Zhong Naixiong was on the list for the first time for 1.5 billion US$ (≈ 10.5 billion CN¥) wealth, ranking 1479.
 On 2 August 2018, Nenking started stepping in esports. It got the Guangzhou franchise of the Overwatch League and organized an OWL team for Guangzhou. The team is lately named as the "Guangzhou Charge".
 On 28 August 2020, Nenking established a new esports brand, "Ultra Prime" for Nenking's esports business. Ultra Prime Esports manages all Nenking's esports teams, such as Guangzhou Charge of the Overwatch League.
 On 17 December 2020, Nenking acquired the LPL team of the Chinese esports franchise "eStar Gaming".
 On 29 March 2021, Nenking Esports Center grand opened. Located in GBA International Sports and Cultural Center, Nenking Esports Center will be the base of Ultra Prime Esports and all Nenking's esports teams. Nenking also announced that "eStar Gaming" LOL Branch was rebranded to "Ultra Prime" LOL Branch.

Major subsidiaries 
 Real estate
 Guangdong Nenking Real Estate Development Co., Ltd
 Property management
 Nanhai Nenking Property Management (Foshan) Co., Ltd
 Financial
 Foshan CFP Financial Co., Ltd
 Sports Culture
 Basketball
 Guangzhou Long-Lions (Chinese Basketball Association)
 Hong Kong Eastern Long Lions (Hong Kong A1 Division & ASEAN Basketball League)
 Macau Black Bears (ASEAN Basketball League)
 Football
 Hong Kong Eastern Long Lions (Hong Kong Premier League)
 FC Sochaux-Montbéliard (Ligue de Football Professionnel - Ligue 2)
 Esports "Ultra Prime"
 Guangzhou Charge (Overwatch League)
 Ultra Prime Academy (Overwatch Contenders)
 Ultra Prime (League of Legends Pro League)
 Arenas
 GBA International Sports and Cultural Center
 Tianhe Gymnasium
 Hoop-Battle
 Pharmaceuticals
 Nanhai Longtime Pharmaceuticals Co., Ltd
 Overseas investment
 First Capital Securities Co., Ltd
 Nanhai Rural Commercial Bank
 Trade purchases
 Guangdong Nenking Import and Export Co., Ltd

References

External links
 

 
Chinese brands
Chinese companies established in 1998
Companies based in Foshan
Conglomerate companies of China
Construction and civil engineering companies of China
Entertainment companies established in 1998
Entertainment companies of China
Financial services companies of China
Health care companies of China
Holding companies established in 1998
Holding companies of China
Investment companies of China
Privately held companies of China
Real estate companies of China
Sports event promotion companies
Technology companies established in 1998
Technology companies of China
Guangzhou Charge
Construction and civil engineering companies established in 1998